Argiolaus is a genus of butterflies in the family Lycaenidae. Most authorities consider
Argiolaus to be a subgenus of Iolaus.
The members (species) of this genus are found in the Afrotropical realm.

External links
 Royal Museum of Central Africa Images

Iolaus (butterfly)
Insect subgenera